The siege of Kerman (1794) was the capture of the city of Kerman by the Qajar forces led by Agha Mohammed Khan Qajar against Zand forces led by Lotf Ali Khan (the last Shah of the Zand dynasty) which resulted in a decisive Qajar victory. After the siege, Tens of thousands were killed, blinded or taken into slavery and it took the city decades to recover.

The siege 
The Afghan chiefs of Bam invited Lotf Ali Khan to return and expel the Qajar yoke. With their help, Lotf Ali Khan returned to Kerman and captured the city on the 30th of March. Agha Mohammad Khan Qajar quickly heard of this and marched towards Kerman on May 14. The siege lasted four months and took a toll on Kerman's population. The city fell on 24 October, and Lotf Ali Khan quickly fled to Bam. However, the chief of Bam gave Lotf Ali Khan to the Qajars and ordered Lotf Ali Khan to be killed. The last of the Zand rulers was finally delivered to Agha Mohammad Khan Qajar, who had long waited to exact revenge on his arch-rival. "The page of history would be stained by a recital of the indignities offered to the royal captive..." It is reported that Lotf Ali Khan was blinded. Lotf Ali Khan was imprisoned and tortured in Tehran before being choked to death in the late of 1794.

Aftermath 
Agha Mohammad Khan exacted a brutal revenge on the people of Kerman for harboring his enemy. All the male inhabitants were killed or blinded, and a pile was made out of 20,000 detached eyeballs and poured in front of the victorious Qajar leader. The women and children were sold into slavery, and the city was destroyed over ninety days. One of the factors in the formation of this event was the incitement of Agha Mohammad Khan by Lotfali Khan Zand and his entourage. Among these provocations were the mockery of the Qajar king and the burning of his grudge more and more. Every evening, the people and women of Kermani recited poems in mockery of Agham Mohammad Khan from the towers attached to the gate, mocking his nobility. Also, Lotfali Khan's act of minting a coin in his own name caused Agha Mohammad Khan , who was known as insane in the court of Karim Khan Zand, to cut off the eyes of Lotfali Khan's seven-year-old son named "Fathullah" with his hands and behead him to win.

See also 

 Agha Mohammad Khan Qajar
 Qajar dynasty
 Lotf Ali Khan
 Zand dynasty
 Kerman

References 

Conflicts in 1794